Giovanni Battista Guttadauro di Reburdone (13 September 1814, Catania - 26 April 1896) was a Roman Catholic priest and bishop.

Life
He was ordained priest on 22 September 1838. His appointment as Bishop of Caltanissetta was on 23 December 1858 and his consecration as bishop was on 9 January 1859 as Santi XII Apostoli in Rome. He was a Council Father at the First Vatican Council.

References

Bishops of Caltanissetta
Religious leaders from Catania
1814 births
1896 deaths